Pierre Eugène Alexandre Marot (15 December 1900, Neufchâteau (Vosges) – 28 November 1992, Paris) was a 20th-century French medievalist historian, director of the École Nationale des Chartes. He was a member of the Institut de France, the Académie de Stanislas, the Société des Amis de Notre-Dame and the Académie des Inscriptions et Belles-Lettres

Publications 
1924: Lettres inédites de François de Neufchâteau (1781-1792)
1925: À propos du centenaire de la Société d'émulation des Vosges
1925: Deux feuillets des vies des saints Arnoul et Philibert dans la reliure du cartulaire de l'abbaye de Chaumousey
1925: L'Obituaire de Varangéville
1925: D'une prétendue numérotation des ducs de Lorraine spéciale aux clercs du trésor des chartes de Lorraine (XVIe siècle)
1926: L'élévation des reliques des saints de Remiremont et le Pape Léon IX
1926: Les seigneurs lorrains à l'ost de 1383
1927: Une représentation du « Santo volto » de Lucques sur un sceau (1412)
1930: À quelle époque Saint Nicolas devint-il le patron de la Lorraine ?
1930: Jean Beaudouin de Rosières-aux-Salines
1931: Notes sur Nicolas Volcyr de Serrouville
1931: Charles Sadoul
1956: Le culte de Jeanne d'Arc à Domrémy
1963: À propos du IIIe centenaire de l'académie
1969: Charles Bruneau et les études lorraines
1975: Jacques Callot, sa vie, son travail, ses éditions : Nouvelles recherches
1975: Les musées des Sociétés savantes, Actes du 100e Congrès national des Sociétés savantes. Colloque interdisciplinaire sur les sociétés savantes, Ministère de l’Éducation nationale, Comité des Travaux Historiques et Scientifiques

Bibliography 
 .
 .

External links 
 Notice du dictionnaire prosopographique du Comité des travaux historiques et scientifiques (CTHS).
 Présentation du fonds Pierre Marot (1900-1992)  170 J 1-22 , Archives départementales des Vosges, Épinal.

French archivists
20th-century French historians
French medievalists
École Nationale des Chartes alumni
Academic staff of the École Nationale des Chartes
Members of the Académie des Inscriptions et Belles-Lettres
Commandeurs of the Légion d'honneur
Commanders of the Ordre national du Mérite
Commandeurs of the Ordre des Palmes Académiques
Officiers of the Ordre des Arts et des Lettres
People from Neufchâteau, Vosges
1900 births
1992 deaths